The mollymawks are a group of medium-sized albatrosses that form the genus Thalassarche. The name has sometimes been used for the genus Phoebetria as well, but these are usually called sooty albatrosses. They are restricted to the Southern Hemisphere, where they are the most common of the albatrosses. They were long considered to be in the same genus as the great albatrosses, Diomedea, but a study of their mitochondrial DNA showed that they are a monophyletic taxon related to the sooty albatrosses, and they were placed in their own genus.

Taxonomy
The genus Thalassarche was introduced in 1853 by the German naturalist Ludwig Reichenbach with the black-browed albatross as the type species. The genus name combines the Ancient Greek thalassa meaning "sea" and arkhē meaning "power" or "command" (from arkhō, to govern).

The word mollymawk, which dates to the late 17th century, comes from the Dutch mallemok, which means mal – foolish and mok – gull. Another etymology suggests that it comes from the German Mallemugge, a term used originally for midges or flies that whirled about lights.

Mollymawks are a type of albatross that belong to the family Diomedeidae of the order Procellariiformes, along with shearwaters, fulmars, storm-petrels, and diving-petrels. They share certain identifying features. First, they have nasal passages that attach to the upper bill called naricorns, although the nostrils are on the sides of the bill. The bills of Procellariiformes are also unique in that they are split into between seven and nine horny plates. They also have a salt gland that is situated above the nasal passage and helps desalinate their bodies, due to the high amount of ocean water that they imbibe. It excretes a high saline solution from their nose. Finally, they produce a stomach oil made up of wax esters and triglycerides that is stored in the proventriculus. This can be sprayed out of their mouths as a defence against predators as well as an energy rich food source for chicks and for the adults during their long flights. The fossil species Thalassarche thyridata known from a skull fragment from the Late Miocene of Victoria, Australia shows that the genus had already diverged from the sooty albatrosses 10 mya.

Species

Extant Species

The genus contains nine species:

Fossils
†Thalassarche thyridata

Description

Mollymawks have what has been described as gull-like plumage, with dark black backs, mantle and tails and lighter heads, underwings and bellies. The heads of several species are often slightly darker grey, or have dark around the eyes. They all have a colourful pinkish flesh stripe from their gape to their ear that is shown during displays. They have distinctive bill structure and colouring which makes for easier identifying than other albatrosses. The bills of mollymawks are either brightly coloured orange or yellow, or dark with several bright yellow lines.

See also
List of albatross breeding locations

References

Further reading

External links

Thalassarche
Taxa named by Ludwig Reichenbach